Food Poker is a BBC tea-time television programme which fuses traditional culinary skills with poker. It is presented by Matt Allwright and voiced over by Jeni Barnett, each episode features four chefs. It was first broadcast on BBC Two between 29 October and 7 December 2007.

Format
The show involves chefs being dealt two food cards and can use up to three ingredients from five more 'shared ingredient' cards. The chefs then decide in secret what dish they will prepare and then choose either to 'pitch' their idea or 'fold', if they don't believe they can cook anything with the available ingredients. Those who pitch their ideas must do so to the Food Poker Panel, which consists of seven food experts. The panel then vote, using poker chips, for the two dishes they wish to see prepared. There are three rounds, the savoury cook-off, the sweet cook-off and the final showcase cook-off.

Once two chefs have been selected by the panel they have 20 minutes to cook their dishes, however they only have 15 minutes during the Sweet Cook-off. This time is very intense and competitive banter between chefs is commonplace. Once the chefs have cooked their dishes they are presented to the seven gourmets who then vote again for their preferred dish (no poker chips are used for this vote). Only the savoury and sweet cook-offs use this format. The showcase cook-off, which automatically features the two winners from the previous two cook-offs, has a different format.

The Showcase Cook-off
In this round the finalists are presented with a single card, which all can see: this ingredient must be the central feature of their dishes. They then have a choice from an array of other ingredient cards from a large selection; once a card has been selected it is not available to the other chef. Therefore, chefs can both take the ingredients they need and/or steal ingredients which they think will be most valuable to their opponents. They then have 20 minutes to prepare their dishes. The two cooked dishes are then presented to the two losing chefs who then vote for their favourite and ultimately the winner, in the event of a tie the winner is decided by presenter, Matt Allwright.

Regular contributing chefs
Martin Blunos
Gennaro Contaldo
Peter Gordon
Maria Elia
Lawrence Keogh
Allegra McEvedy
Jun Tanaka
Atul Kochhar
Stuart Gillies 
Paul Rankin
Theo Randall

External links

Food Poker on ukgameshows website

2007 British television series debuts
2007 British television series endings
2000s British cooking television series
BBC Television shows
Food reality television series
British cooking television shows
Television series by All3Media
Television shows about poker
Poker in Europe